Mother's Daughter may refer to:

 "Mother's Daughter", a song by Gregg Rolie, featured on the 1970 album Abraxas by Santana.
 "Mother's Daughter", a 2003 episode of the Canadian television series Miracles
 "Mother's Daughter" (song), a 2019 song by American singer Miley Cyrus
 Mother's Daughter and Other Songs, a 2005 album by English folk band Tunng
 This Mother's Daughter, a 1976 album by American singer Nancy Wilson

See also
 Mothers & Daughters (disambiguation)